Two ships of the United States Navy have been named Duluth, after the city of Duluth, Minnesota.

  was a  light cruiser commissioned late in World War II.
  was an  commissioned in 1966 and decommissioned in 2005.

United States Navy ship names